Geography is the debut album by Front 242, released in 1982.

Critical reception
Dave Thompson, in Alternative Rock, wrote that the album "boasts three dancey gems still being sampled (or spun) today and a clutch of other crucial songs which would be equally influential outside the club scene."

Track listing

GEOGRAPHY - VINTAGE REISSUE - LIMITED EDITION (2 CD)

(This double-CD was completely remastered and rebuilt by Daniel Bressanutti. Some tracks differ notably in sound)

Samples
The 1971 science fiction film THX 1138 was sampled in the song "Operating Tracks".

References

Front 242 albums
1982 debut albums
Wax Trax! Records albums
Red Rhino Records albums
Epic Records albums